Hacıye Pertevpiyale Nevfidan Kadın ("chalice of light" and "young seedling"; 4 January 1793 - 27 December 1855) was a consort of Sultan Mahmud II of the Ottoman Empire.

Life
She was the BaşKadin (First Consort) of Ottoman Sultan Mahmud II after the death of the firsts two. She was already Mahmud's concubine when he was still a Şehzade and on 4 February 1809, six months after Mahmud accession to the throne she gave birth to Fatma Sultan, Mahmud II's first child. Her birth, the first in the imperial dynasty after 19 years and just six months after her father's accession to the throne, caused scandal, as it meant she must have been conceived when Mahmud was still Şehzade and confined to Kafes, which was forbidden at the time, but the princess died on 5 August 1809. On 30 April 1810 she give birth a second daughter, also named Fatma Sultan, but the princess died on 7 May 1825. On 17 June 1813, she gave birth to Şehzade Osman and his twin Emine Sultan, but the prince died on 10 April 1814 and the princess on July 1814. On 7 January 1815 she gave birth to Emine Sultan, but the princess died on 25 September 1816. She was the second consort of Sultan Mahmud who underwent the holy pilgrimage. The children of Nevfidan Kadın all died young, and in 1830, after the death of Adile Sultan's mother Zernigar Kadin, Adile was entrusted to the care of Nevfidan Kadın.

After the death of Sultan Mahmud, she asked Abdulmejid for permission to go on a pilgrimage. After completing it, she returned to Istanbul in 1842 and take the name "Hacıye". She had a seal commissioned made for the occasion: "His Heavenly Majesty Sultan Mahmud, Her Highness Haciye Nevfîdan Baş Kadın”.

In 1845, Adile married Mehmet Ali Pasha. who had been serving as an advisor in the imperial arsenal. After the wedding, Adile went to live at Neşatabad Palace, which was allocated to her in Fındıklı.

Sultan Abdülaziz, Abdülmecid's half-brother and his heir, named one of his ships the "Pertevpiyale" in her honor. 

Nevfidan Kadın received love and respect from Abdulmejid. She protected the poor and helped the needy; she also built foundations for the poor in Mecca and Medina. She was a very religious woman.

Death
Nevfidan Kadın died on 27 December 1855 in Nafizpaşa Palace, Beylerbeyi, and was buried in the tomb of her husband Sultan Mahmud.

Issue
By Mahmud II, Nevfidan had a son and four daughters:
Fatma Sultan (4 February 1809 - 5 August 1809). Her birth, the first in the imperial dynasty after 19 years and just six months after her father's accession to the throne, caused scandal, as it meant she must have been conceived when Mahmud was still Şehzade and confined in the Kafes, which was forbidden at the time. She died of smallpox and was buried in the Nurosmaniye Mosque.
Fatma Sultan (30 April 1810 - 7 May 1825). She died of smallpox and was buried in the türbe of Nakşidil Sultan.
Emine Sultan (12 June 1813 - July 1814). Twin sister of Şehzade Osman. She was buried in the Nurosmaniye mosque.
Şehzade Osman (12 June 1813 - 10 April 1814). Twin brother of Emine Sultan. He was buried in the Nurosmaniye Mosque.
Emine Sultan (7 January 1815 - 24 September 1816). She died in Beylerbeyi Palace in a fire. She was buried in the Yahya Efendi mausoleum.

After her children death, in 1830 Nevfidan was entrusted to raise one of Mahmud's other daughters who had just lost her mother:
Adile Sultan (23 May 1826 - 12 February 1899). Her natural mother was Zernigar Kadın, dead on 1830. She married once and had a son and three daughters.

References

Sources

1855 deaths
19th-century consorts of Ottoman sultans
Ottoman Sunni Muslims
1793 births